Canoeing has been featured as competition sports in the Mediterranean Games irregularly. It has appeared in the 1979, 1991-1997 and 2005-2008 Mediterranean Games.

Two styles of boats are or have been used in this sport: canoes with 1 or 2 canoers and kayaks with 1, 2 or 4 kayakers.  This leads to the name designation of each event.  For example, "C-1" is a canoe singles event and "K-2" is a kayak doubles event.  Races are usually 500 metres or 1000 metres long, although there are other distances.

Summary

Events

Overall medal table 

Updated after the 2022 Mediterranean Games (did not featured canoeing competitions).

References 

 
Mediterranean Games
Canoeing